The 2022 SRS Distribution 250 was the twelfth stock car race of the 2022 NASCAR Xfinity Series and the 26th iteration of the event. The race was held on Saturday, May 21, 2022, in Fort Worth, Texas at Texas Motor Speedway, a  permanent quad-oval racetrack. The race was contested over 167 laps. Tyler Reddick, driving for Big Machine Racing, dominated during the end of the race, and earned his tenth career NASCAR Xfinity Series win. It was also the first NASCAR win for Big Machine Racing. To fill out the podium, William Byron and Sam Mayer, both driving for JR Motorsports, finished second and third, respectively.

Background 
Texas Motor Speedway is a speedway located in the northernmost portion of the U.S. city of Fort Worth, Texas – the portion located in Denton County, Texas. The reconfigured track measures  with banked 20° in turns 1 and 2 and banked 24° in turns 3 and 4. Texas Motor Speedway is a quad-oval design, where the front straightaway juts outward slightly. The track layout is similar to Atlanta Motor Speedway and Charlotte Motor Speedway. The track is owned by Speedway Motorsports, Inc.

Entry list 

 (R) denotes rookie driver.
 (i) denotes driver who are ineligible for series driver points.

Notes

Practice 
The only 30-minute practice session was held on Friday, May 20, at 5:00 PM CST.

Qualifying 
Qualifying was held on Friday, May 20, at 5:30 PM CST. Since Texas Motor Speedway is an oval track, the qualifying system used is a single-car, one-lap system with only one round. Whoever sets the fastest time in the round wins the pole.

Race results 
Stage 1 Laps: 40

Stage 2 Laps: 40

Stage 3 Laps: 87

Standings after the race 

Drivers' Championship standings

Note: Only the first 12 positions are included for the driver standings.

References 

2022 NASCAR Xfinity Series
NASCAR races at Texas Motor Speedway
SRS Distribution 250
2022 in sports in Texas